Ivan Ženatý (born February 2, 1962) is a Czech violinist.

Ženatý appears regularly as a guest artist with famed ensembles internationally such as BBC Symphony Orchestra of London, Symphonieorchester des Bayerischen Rundfunks, Berliner Sympphoniker, Orchestra Nacional de Madrid as well as with all of the orchestras in his home land, in prior with the Czech Philharmonic Orechestra, the Prague Symphony Orchestra and the Prague Radio Symphony Orchestra. What mostly attracts attention are his solo and chamber music projects (the complete Bach Sonatas and Partitas for violin solo or Beethoven and Brahms Sonatas from recent seasons). Ivan Zenaty reaches abroad public without abandoning the world of classical music for even a moment. Besides the technical perfection everyone would expect, he is also appreciated for his taste and style and for his captivatingly beautiful tone.

The violinist began his professional career with his participation in the finale of the Tchaikovsky Competition in Moscow, followed by his debut with the Czech Philharmonic and Libor Pesek and his first prize at the Prague Spring Competition. He earned the title of laureate at the UNESCO International Rostrum of Young Performers (1989). in 1990 Mr. Zenaty made his debut in London, in 1991 at the Berliner Philharmonie and the Concertgebouw in Amsterdam, in 1994 in Tokyo and in 1996 in New York and Buenos Aires. He has collaborated with Yehudi Menuhin, Yo-Yo Ma, Serge Baudo, Valery Gergiev, Andrey Boreyko, Neville Marriner and many others.

The musicianship of Ivan Zenaty has been influenced the most by his personal encounters with Nathan Milstein, Ruggiero Ricci and Andre Gertler, and a major change to his musical thinking was initiated by Prof. Bezrodny at the Tchaikovsky Conservatory in Moscow. What he valuate at most, however, have been his private lessons with Josef Suk and many subsequent years of their collaboration, climaxing with performances at the Würzburger Mozart-Festspiele and the Prague Spring Festival and with a recording of the complete works of W. A. Mozart.

Ivan Zenaty's recordings have always aroused the enthusiastic acclaim of listeners and music critics. Throughout the period of his artistic activity, there has been an apparent concentration on the complete works of such great composers as Telemann, Bach, Mendelssohn, Schumann, Schulhoff, Dvorak and Grieg recorded for Dorian Recordings in New York. His new complete Dvorak recording (www.audite.de) has attracted extraordinary attention, as well as has his recording of both violin concertos by J. B. Foerster with the BBC SO London and its music director Jiri Belohlavek (www.supraphon.cz).

Thanks to the Harmony Foundation of New York, Ivan Zenaty plays on a rare Giuseppe Guarneri del Gesu violin made in 1740.

In addition to master classes in Germany, Spain, USA and Canada, Ivan Zenaty taught at Hochschule für Musik Carl Maria von Weber in Dresden.  In 2012, Ivan Zenaty was appointed to the strings faculty at the prestigious Cleveland Institute of Music.
Since oktober 2018 Ivan Zanaty has been visiting professor at The Royal Danish Academy of Music.

Prizes 

 1982 - he was a finalist of the International Pyotr Ilyich Tchaikovsky Violin Competition in Moscow
 1987 - he was a sovereign winner of the International Prague Spring Violin Competition 
 1989 - he was awarded the title Laureate of the International Tribune of Young Performers UNESCO 
 1990 - the main prize of the Ruggiero Ricci international master-classes in Berlin which resulted in his engagement as a soloist of the Berlin Philharmonic.

External links
 Biography
 Concerts-prague.cz

1962 births
Living people
Czech classical violinists
Male classical violinists
Cleveland Institute of Music faculty
21st-century classical violinists
21st-century Czech male musicians